Viliami Maumau (born April 3, 1975) is a Tongan-born former player of American football. Born on Kolovai, Tonga, he played as a defensive tackle for the University of Colorado and was a 3rd Team All Big 12 selection as a junior.  Maumau attended St. Louis School in Honolulu and was a teammate of Olin Kreutz and Chris Fuamatu-Ma'afala.  He also played one year of NFL football for the Carolina Panthers in 1999.

References

External links
Databasefootball.com

1975 births
Living people
Tongan emigrants to the United States
Tongan players of American football
American football defensive tackles
Colorado Buffaloes football players
Carolina Panthers players